Ashley Nee (born June 15, 1989) is an American slalom kayaker who has competed at the international level since 2004.

Early life and education 
Nee is from Darnestown, Maryland. She began paddling after a chance encounter at Valley Mill Camp at the age of 10 and participated in racing when she was 12 years old. Nee attended Northwest High School. She attended University of Hawaii before transferring to University of Maryland, College Park to pursue a degree in kinesiology. Nee was an emergency medical technician in Montgomery County, Maryland.

Career 
Nee trains at the Dickerson Whitewater Course. In 2008, Nee qualified the berth for the 2008 Summer Olympics but was unable to win the spot due to a shoulder injury. She won the overall World Cup title in Extreme K1 in 2019. Nee won bronze at the 2015 Pan American Games. She finished in 14th place in the K1 event at the 2016 Summer Olympics in Rio de Janeiro.

World Cup individual podiums

Personal life 
Nee is openly gay. She is married to Ashley McEwan. They met in 2008 while Nee was working at a summer camp. She moved to Hawaii with her wife in 2008 to get a break from paddling and racing. They moved back to Maryland in 2012.

References 

1989 births
Living people
American female canoeists
Canoeists at the 2016 Summer Olympics
Olympic canoeists of the United States
Pan American Games medalists in canoeing
Pan American Games bronze medalists for the United States
Canoeists at the 2015 Pan American Games
American LGBT sportspeople
Sportspeople from Montgomery County, Maryland
People from Montgomery County, Maryland
University of Maryland, College Park alumni
LGBT people from Maryland
Emergency medical technicians
Lesbian sportswomen
LGBT canoeists
Medalists at the 2015 Pan American Games
21st-century LGBT people
21st-century American women